r/AmItheAsshole, abbreviated as AITA, is a subreddit where users post about their real-world interpersonal conflicts and receive judgement from fellow Redditors. Some posts, such as the December 2021 thread about an orange tabby named Jorts, are shared on other social media platforms besides Reddit. The subreddit allows users to determine the morality of absurd, specific scenarios.

History
The subreddit was created in 2013 by photographer and dog rescuer Marc Beaulac to determine if he had been inappropriately mansplaining in a debate with female coworkers about the temperature of their office. The subreddit gained popularity in of 2018. By July 2019, it had 1 million members, which it dubs "potential assholes." A Twitter account reposts a curated selection of the posts.

r/AmItheAsshole is based around the concept of posting situations from users' personal lives for judgement. Any user (typically from a single-use account referred to as a throwaway) can make a post, beginning with "AITA", asking if they're an asshole for what they did in a situation they were involved in. Other users can judge them with the ratings of YTA (you're the asshole), NTA (not the asshole), NAH (no assholes here), or ESH (everyone sucks here). An example of the conundrums posted is “AITA for switching to regular milk to prove my lactose intolerant roommate keeps stealing from me?” As of October 2020, the subreddit receives about 800 scenarios per day.

Princeton University ethicist Eleanor Gordon-Smith said to The Guardian, “There’s something almost thrilling about peeking behind the curtain into other people’s lives, hearing their weird thoughts – what they think deep down of their partners, children, friends.”

References

External links

Amitheasshole
Internet properties established in 2013